Phycoma is a monotypic moth genus of the family Erebidae erected by Jacob Hübner in 1823. Its only species, Phycoma marcellina, was first described by Stoll in 1780. It is found in Suriname.

References

Calpinae
Monotypic moth genera